Tortall and Other Lands: A Collection of Tales is a collection of short stories by young adult fantasy author Tamora Pierce. The anthology includes stories set in Tortall, a fantasy kingdom appearing in many of Pierce's works, as well as stories set in the real world. In addition, besides gathering together Pierce's seven previously published short stories, Tortall and Other Lands includes three original stories written specifically for this collection.

Contents
Many of the stories in the collection have been published previously in anthologies and magazines. The stories are listed below in the order in which they appear in the book.

References 

2012 short story collections
Tortallan books
Random House books